Asura nigripuncta is a moth of the family Erebidae. It is found in the Philippines.

References

nigripuncta
Moths of Asia